Per Cock-Clausen (23 September 1912 – 11 August 2002) was a Danish figure skater. He was born in Frederiksberg, Denmark. He was the 13-time Danish National Champion from 1940 to 1963 (held intermittently) and Nordic Champion from 1949 to 1951 and in 1953. He competed at both the 1948 and 1952 Winter Olympic Games finishing 16th and 14th, respectively. He was the son of architect Alf Cock-Clausen. After his competitive career, he became a member of the Copenhagen City Council as a member of the Conservative People's Party.

Results

References

 Per Cock-Clausen's grave 
 Per Cock-Clausen's profile at Sports Reference.com

1912 births
2002 deaths
Danish male single skaters
Olympic figure skaters of Denmark
Figure skaters at the 1948 Winter Olympics
Figure skaters at the 1952 Winter Olympics
Sportspeople from Frederiksberg

20th-century Copenhagen City Council members